The 2019 ADAC Formula 4 Championship was the fifth season of the ADAC Formula 4, an open-wheel motor racing series. It was a multi-event motor racing championship that featured drivers competing in 1.4 litre Tatuus-Abarth single seat race cars that conformed to the technical regulations for the championship. It began on 27 April at Oschersleben and finished on 29 September at Sachsenring after seven triple header rounds.

Teams and drivers

Race calendar and results
Venues for the 2019 season were announced with the first Hockenheim round as support event of the 2019 German Grand Prix, while other event are scheduled to support 2019 ADAC GT Masters.

Championship standings

Points are awarded to the top 10 classified finishers in each race. No points are awarded for pole position or fastest lap.

Drivers' Championship

Rookie Championship

Teams' Championship
Before each round, teams nominate two drivers to be eligible for Teams' Championship points.

References

Notes

External links
 

ADAC Formula 4 seasons
ADAC
ADAC Formula 4
ADAC F4